St Mark's Cathedral is the main place of Catholic worship in the city of Port Pirie, Australia and is the seat of the bishop of the Roman Catholic Diocese of Port Pirie (Dioecesis Portus Piriensis).

The church was inaugurated on 9 July 1882, with the design of architect C. Polain, of Napperby, and was elevated to the dignity of a cathedral in 1887. The church was destroyed by fire on 21 October 1947. The newly restored cathedral was reopened in 1953.

See also
Catholic Church in Australia

References

Roman Catholic cathedrals in South Australia
Buildings and structures in Port Pirie
Roman Catholic churches completed in 1882
Roman Catholic churches in South Australia
19th-century Roman Catholic church buildings in Australia